Otto Wonderly (c. 1878 - April 2, 1905) was a Canadian Thoroughbred horse racing jockey from Ontario who competed in his native Canada and in the United States where he died from a racetrack accident.

Before embarking on a riding career, Wonderly worked as a newsboy for the Grand Trunk Railway. He was riding at a track in Windsor, Ontario when some prominent Canadian horsemen recognized his natural talent and arranged for him to go to the United States. There, he was placed under contract by James Ben Ali Haggin, one of America's preeminent horsemen and owner of the renowned Elmendorf Farm in Lexington, Kentucky. Haggin paid Wonderly $15,000 for second call on his services for eight months. He would later ride for a Chicago based stable and as well would ride in the United States and Canada for leading Canadian owner, Joseph E. Seagram.

Career highlights
On July 25, 1901, Wonderly won four races in a row on a six-race card at Fort Erie Racetrack. Another highlight of Wonderly's career came on June 14, 1902 at the Sheepshead Bay Race Track in Brooklyn, New York when he won the most prestigious race in the United States for horses of all ages. For owners Fred C. McLewee and Diamond Jim Brady, Wonderly captured the famous Suburban Handicap aboard Gold Heels in race record time on an off track in front of more than 50,000 spectators.

Death
Riding freelance in 1905, on April 1 Wonderly was exercising a horse at Montgomery Park Race Track in Memphis, Tennessee when he was thrown to the ground that caused severe head injuries.

He passed away the following day St. Joseph's Hospital. His body was shipped to his family in London, Ontario for interment.

References

Canadian jockeys
American jockeys
Jockeys who died while racing
Sports deaths in Tennessee
Sportspeople from Ontario
Canadian emigrants to the United States
1870s births
1905 deaths
Year of birth uncertain